Bozsik (probably of Western Slavic origin, possibly from the masculine given name Boško – itself derived from the Slavic word boh/bog/bóh for "god" – followed by the Slavic diminutive suffix -ik, and thus of  theophoric origin) is a Hungarian surname. It may refer to:
 Gábor Bozsik (born 1981), Hungarian sprint canoer
 József Bozsik (1925–1978), Hungarian footballer
 Levente Bozsik (born 1980), former Hungarian footballer
 Péter Bozsik (born 1961), Hungarian football manager

References 

Hungarian-language surnames
Theophoric names
Surnames from given names